Mónica Soares (born 5 July 1994) is a Portuguese handballer who plays for Alavarium/Love Tiles and the Portugal national team.

Achievements  
1ª Divisão de Andebol Feminino:  
Winner: 2014, 2015

Individual awards 
 EHF Junior European Championship Top Scorer: 2013

References

1994 births
Living people
People from Aveiro, Portugal
Portuguese female handball players
Sportspeople from Aveiro District